Moscow State University of Instrument Engineering and Computer Science (MSUIECS (MGUPI in Russian); is one of the technical universities of Moscow and Russia. Founded in 1936 as the Moscow Correspondence Institute of the metal industry. MSUIECS offers a wide range of educational programs to prepare specialists, masters, bachelors, PhDs and doctors of different sciences.

Campus
To perform educational and research activities MGUPI unites 9 departments consisting of 41 chairs and ten subsidiaries in Moscow, Tver, Yaroslavl and other regions.

Faculties
 Technological computer science (ТИ)
 Information Security (BA, MA)
 Materials Science (BA, MA)
 Mechanical engineering (BA, MA)
 Technological machines and equipment 
 Design-engineering software engineering industries (BA, MA)
 Automation of technological processes and production (BA, MA)
 Innovation
 Nanotechnology and Microsystems
 Art Materials Processing Technology
 Design of aircraft and rocket engines (specialist)
 Ground transport and technology tools (specialist) 
 Computer science (ИТ)
 Instrument making and electronics (ПР)
 Economics (ЭФ)
 Economics (BA, MA)
 Applied Computer Science (BA, MA)
 Economic Security (specialist)
 Management and law (УП)
 Jurisprudence
 Management (BA, MA)
 Personnel Management (BA, MA)
 State and Municipal Management
 Applied Computer Science (MA)
 Legal maintenance of national security (specialist)
 Faculty of Specialized Secondary Education
 Evening faculty
 Faculty of Professional Skills Upgrading

International cooperation
The University maintains close academic and scientific contacts with Germany, Great Britain, France, Finland, Bulgaria, Poland and other countries. The University has signed agreements with Berlin Technical University, the University of Sofia, University of Jyvaskyla (Finland), Varna Technical University (Bulgaria). University senior staff and leading professors take an active part in big international symposiums and workshops, conferences held in Europe, both Americas and Asia; they also deliver lectures and lead joint research with educational establishments and research centers of many countries.

Branches 
The University has also several branches:
 Dmitrov 
 Kashira
 Kimry
 Lytkarino
 Mozhaysk
 Sergiyev Posad
 Serpukhov
 Stavropol
 Chekhov
 Uglich

See also 
 Education in Russia
 List of universities in Russia

References

External links 

 Official Page (Russian version)
 Technopark
 General information

Educational institutions established in 1936
Education in the Soviet Union
Universities in Moscow
1936 establishments in the Soviet Union
Computing in the Soviet Union